The 1951–52 NCAA men's basketball season began in December 1951, progressed through the regular season and conference tournaments, and concluded with the 1952 NCAA basketball tournament championship game on March 26, 1952, at Hec Edmundson Pavilion in Seattle, Washington. The Kansas Jayhawks won their first NCAA national championship with a 80–63 victory over the St. John's Redmen.

Season headlines

 The 1951–52 season was the last one in which colleges and universities could include non-collegiate opponents in their schedules with the games recognized as part of their official record for the season, a common practice for many years. After the season, the NCAA ruled that colleges and universities could no longer count games played against non-collegiate opponents in their annual won-loss records.
Long Island University began the first season of its six-year ban from playing NCAA basketball as a result of the CCNY point-shaving scandal that had been revealed in 1951.
 The NCAA tournament had a true "Final Four" for the first time, with the winners at four regional sites advancing to play at the finals site.
 The NCAA tournament received regional television coverage for the first time.

Harlem Globetrotters vs. Seattle University
On January 21, 1952, the Harlem Globetrotters played Seattle in a game designed to raise funds for the United States Olympic efforts. Five days before the game was held, Royal Brougham received a call from Howard Hobson, who was the Yale basketball coach and a United States Olympic Committee member. It was reported that money was needed to support the country's Olympic effort for the games held in Helsinki, Finland. The Globetrotters had agreed to a three-game fund-raiser against college teams in the West, Midwest and East.

Tickets cost $1.50 and they were sold out in 48 hours. Jazz great Louis Armstrong played at halftime and actress Joan Caulfield performed a ceremonial opening tip off. The game was played at the University of Washington's Hec Edmondson Pavilion and was filled to its 12,500 capacity.

The Globetrotters were considered the best basketball team in the world and the club paid their two star players "Goose" Tatum and Marques Hayes twenty five thousand dollars each. Entering the game with Seattle, the Globetrotters had played 3571 games winning 93 percent of their contests.

Seattle player Johnny O'Brien was the nation's leading scorer at that time. O'Brien would become the first player in the history of college basketball to score 1000 points in a single season. He would finish the season with 1,051 points. Against the Globetrotters, O'Brien poured in 43 points. Johnny's brother Eddie  played point guard for Chieftains and his half court shot lifted the club to a 10-point lead.

After halftime, the Globetrotters got back in the game as Johnny O'Brien sat out most of the third quarter. With seconds left in the game, the Globetrotters called a time out they did not have. A free throw was made by Johnny O'Brien and there was a possession change. The Chieftains were ahead 84–81.

Globetrotter owner Abe Saperstein was so upset that he canceled the rest of the Trotters benefit schedule that year.

Major rule changes
Beginning in 1951–52, the following rules change was implemented:
Games were divided into four 10-minute quarters. Previously, they had been divided into two 20-minute halves.

Conference membership changes

Regular season

Conference winners and tournaments

Informal championships

Statistical leaders

Year-end polls

The final regular-season top 20 from the AP and Coaches Polls.

Postseason tournaments

NCAA tournament

Phog Allen led the Kansas Jayhawks to their first NCAA tournament title, defeating St. John's 80–63.  Jayhawk All-American Clyde Lovellette broke the NCAA record by scoring 141 points in the tournament and was named tournament Most Outstanding Player.

Final Four

Third Place – Illinois 67, Santa Clara 64

National Invitation tournament

La Salle won the National Invitation Tournament by beating Dayton, 75–64.  Tom Gola and Norm Grekin were named co-MVPs.

NIT semifinals and final
Played at Madison Square Garden in New York City 

 Third Place – St. Bonaventure 48, Duquesne 34

Award winners

Consensus All-American team

Major player of the year awards

 Helms Foundation Player of the Year: Clyde Lovellette, Kansas

Other major awards

 NIT/Haggerty Award (Top player in NYC): Ron MacGilvray, St. John's

Coaching changes 

A number of teams changed coaches during the season and after it ended.

References

Statistical Leaders from 1953 Official Collegiate Basketball Record Book, (Copyright 1952, National Collegiate Athletic Bureau)